Brijmohan Agrawal is an Indian politician and former Home minister of Government of Chhattisgarh. He is a member of Bharatiya Janata Party

Political career
He was first elected to Madhya Pradesh Legislative Assembly in 1990 from Raipur Town Constituency and was re-elected in 1993 and 1998 from the same constituency. After the creation of Chhattisgarh out of Madhya Pradesh, he was elected to Chhattisgarh Legislative Assembly in 2003 from same seat and became Cabinet Minister for Home, Prison, Culture and Tourism. He was given charge of Revenue, Culture, and Tourism, Law and Rehabilitation in 2005 and additional charge of forest, sports and youth Affairs in 2006. In 2008, Raipur Town seat got restructured and divided into 9 seats & Agrawal contested from Raipur City South and won by margin of 65,686 and became Cabinet Minister for School Education, Public Works Department, Parliamentary Affairs, Tourism, and Endowment Trust Culture in second Raman Singh's Ministry. Again, in 2013 he won Raipur City South seat by margin of 34,799 and became Cabinet Minister for Agriculture & Bio-Technology, Animal Husbandry, Fish Rearing, Water Resources, Irrigation, Ayacut and Religious Trusts & Endowment in Raman Singh Third ministry.In 2018, he reached the assembly from Raipur South for the third time in a row with 77,589 votes and is currently an MLA from the same constituency.

References

External links 
 Official website
 Brijmohan Agrawal Biography

Living people
Marwari people
Bharatiya Janata Party politicians from Chhattisgarh
State cabinet ministers of Chhattisgarh
1959 births
Chhattisgarh MLAs 2003–2008
Chhattisgarh MLAs 2008–2013
Chhattisgarh MLAs 2013–2018
People from Raipur, Chhattisgarh
Chhattisgarh MLAs 2018–2023
Madhya Pradesh MLAs 1990–1992
Madhya Pradesh MLAs 1993–1998
Madhya Pradesh MLAs 1998–2003